Steve Andrews (aka "The Bard of Ely"), was born in Canton, Cardiff in 1953 and lived in Ely for 25 years, a suburb on the outskirts of Cardiff in South Wales. He is a singer-songwriter, writer and Journalist with a strong interest in botany and conservation. Andrews is known for having a brightly coloured beard and being a Welsh icon.

Writing career
He was dubbed "The Bard of Ely" by Big Issue Cymru when he had a regular column in the publication.

Andrews is the author of "Herbs of the Northern Shaman" published by O-Books and Hummadruz and a Life of High Strangeness.

He has written articles and features for many publications including Tenerife News newspaper, Big Issue, Kindred Spirit, Eye on Life magazine, Prediction, Permaculture, Feed Your Brain, Living Tenerife and the National Federation of Occupational Pensioners magazines.

He has a Cardiff University BA (Honours) degree in Journalism, Film and Broadcast.

Television and radio
Andrews was a co-presenter for two series of "In Full View" on the BBC Choice Digital channel and has also been featured on HTV's "Weird Wales" and appeared as a musician on BBC Cymru Wales' "The Slate", and a guest on BBC2's "Roll over Beethoven". Also his song "Rubber Ducky" was used in the drama Y Tŷ ("The House") on S4C.

Andrews was a guest on many of Steve Johnson's radio shows in Wales.

Music
Andrews has released a number of albums since 1989 on various indie record labels, including a collaboration with Ian Kaye and Philip Moxham (from "Young Marble Giants") called "Taffia EP" and has had tracks released on a number of compilations.

Discography:

Tracks contained in compilations:

Featured in
 the book "The World's Most Mysterious People" by Lionel and Patricia Fanthorpe
 the book "The Last of the Hippies" and other titles by C.J. Stone
 as Peter's guide to the west of Cardiff in the book "Real Cardiff" by Peter Finch
 quoted at length in the book "Leonard Cohen: a remarkable life" by Anthony Reynolds

References 

Welsh writers
1950 births
Living people
Welsh male singers
Writers from Cardiff
Journalists from Cardiff